"Harry Houdini" (titled as "Arts in 'D' Minor/Harry Houdini" on the album) is a song by Canadian synth-pop duo Kon Kan, released as the second single from their 1989 debut album Move to Move. The song did not match the success of their previous single "I Beg Your Pardon", managing to just scrape into the top forty in their native Canada at No. 39 and peaking at No. 88 in the UK, although it was a bigger hit in New Zealand, where it reached No. 14 in September 1989.

The song contains a sample of "White Lines" by Grandmaster Melle Mel and a vocal interpolation of Blondie's "The Tide Is High".

Charts

References

1988 songs
1989 singles
Kon Kan songs
Atlantic Records singles
Harry Houdini